Ma Leilei (born March 22, 1989 in Tianjin) is a Chinese former footballer who last played for Newcastle Jets in the A-League.

Club career
Ma Leilei joined top tier side Tianjin Teda F.C. in July 2008 and would make his debut for the club on September 21, 2008 in a league game against Shanghai Shenhua in a 1–1 draw where he came on as a substitute. After that game Ma would start to become a regular within the side and would go on to score his first two senior level goals in a 2009 AFC Champions League game on May 5, 2009 against Kawasaki Frontale in a 3–1 victory. After that game he was soon touted as the successor of club legend and former Chinese international Yu Genwei.
In October 2016 he joined Australian club Newcastle Jets as part of owner Martin Lee's request that there will be Chinese players at the Jets.

Ma confirmed his retirement in March 2020.

Career statistics

Club

Honours

International
China U-17
 AFC U-17 Championship: 2004

References

External links
Player profile at sodasoccer.com
Player stats at sohu.com

1989 births
Living people
Chinese footballers
Footballers from Tianjin
Tianjin Jinmen Tiger F.C. players
Qingdao Hainiu F.C. (1990) players
Meizhou Hakka F.C. players
Chinese Super League players
China League One players
C.D. Cova da Piedade players
Newcastle Jets FC players
Chinese expatriate footballers
Expatriate footballers in Portugal
Chinese expatriate sportspeople in Portugal
Association football midfielders